Troutdale Methodist Episcopal Church (Troutdale Full Gospel Church) is a historic church at 302 SE Harlow Street in Troutdale, Oregon.

It was built in 1895 and added to the National Register of Historic Places in 1993.

References

1895 establishments in Oregon
19th-century Methodist church buildings in the United States
Carpenter Gothic church buildings in Oregon
Churches completed in 1895
Churches in Multnomah County, Oregon
Methodist churches in Oregon
National Register of Historic Places in Multnomah County, Oregon
Troutdale, Oregon